The Robert Irvine Show is an American daytime talk show hosted by Robert Irvine and produced by Tribune Studios and Irwin Entertainment. The show premiered on The CW on September 12, 2016, as part of their late afternoon timeslot, and replaced Bill Cunningham's self-titled show after his television retirement. Like Cunningham, along with Irvine's Food Network series Restaurant: Impossible, it featured Irvine in the traditional conflict-resolution talk format trying to work out problems between subjects who came on the series.

Until the start of its second season in September 2017, it was the final program distributed by the American Big Five over-the-air networks to still be produced in standard definition, albeit in a widescreen format.

The show ceased production after the completion of the second season, with the last original episode airing May 24, 2018 (a clip show one day later was the final regular episode), with repeats ending September 8. It was replaced by encore and unaired original episodes of Jerry Springer under an arrangement with Tribune Media and NBCUniversal Television Distribution.

References

External links
 Official website
 

2010s American television talk shows
2016 American television series debuts
2018 American television series endings
English-language television shows
First-run syndicated television programs in the United States
Television series by Tribune Entertainment
The CW original programming